Aerobic means "requiring air," in which "air" usually means oxygen.

Aerobic may also refer to
 Aerobic exercise, prolonged exercise of moderate intensity 
 Aerobics, a form of aerobic exercise
 Aerobic respiration, the aerobic process of cellular respiration
 Aerobic organism, a living thing with an oxygen-based metabolism

See also
 Anaerobic (disambiguation)